Mobile One is an American television series that aired on the ABC network from September 12, 1975 to January 5, 1976. The show was a production of Jack Webb's Mark VII Limited for Universal Television.  It was the only Mark VII Limited show to air on ABC.

Premise
Unlike most of Mark VII's other productions, Mobile One was not based on the real-life exploits of a police force or any other governmental agency. The show was set instead in a local television station's electronic news gathering operation, which at the time was a very new technology. Jackie Cooper starred as on-screen reporter Peter Campbell; Julie Gregg played Maggie Spencer, Campbell's producer; and Mark Wheeler played camera operator Doug McKnight. Much of the show was spent covering Campbell and McKnight's travels to the scenes of crimes, accidents, and other newsworthy events in a mobile unit car, thereby resembling Mark VII's Emergency! (which concurrently aired on NBC) in an emphasis upon action and adventure.

Episodes

Production notes
The show was produced by William Bowers and created by James M. Miller; Cooper also directed at least one episode. ABC initially scheduled the show on Friday nights against NBC's Sanford and Son and Chico and the Man and CBS' M*A*S*H; it moved to Monday nights starting on October 27, 1975. Ratings were poor and the network cancelled the series after only thirteen episodes.

The 90-minute pilot film for the series, Mobile Two, aired on ABC on September 2, 1975.

References
 Total Television: A Comprehensive Guide to Programming from 1948 to the Present, Alex McNeil, New York: Penguin, revised ed., 1984.

External links
 
 
 InBaseline

American Broadcasting Company original programming
1975 American television series debuts
1976 American television series endings
1970s American television series
Television series by Mark VII Limited
Television series by Universal Television
Television series about journalism
English-language television shows
Television shows set in Philadelphia